In mathematics, a sub-Riemannian manifold is a certain type of generalization of a Riemannian manifold. Roughly speaking, to measure distances in a sub-Riemannian manifold, you are allowed to go only along curves tangent to so-called horizontal subspaces.
 
Sub-Riemannian manifolds (and so, a fortiori, Riemannian manifolds) carry a natural intrinsic metric called the metric of Carnot–Carathéodory. The Hausdorff dimension of such metric spaces is always an integer and larger than its topological dimension (unless it is actually a Riemannian manifold).

Sub-Riemannian manifolds often occur in the study of constrained systems in classical mechanics, such as the motion of vehicles on a surface, the motion of robot arms, and the orbital dynamics of satellites. Geometric quantities such as the Berry phase may be understood in the language of sub-Riemannian geometry. The Heisenberg group, important to quantum mechanics, carries a natural sub-Riemannian structure.

Definitions

.

Any sub-Riemannian manifold carries the natural intrinsic metric, called the metric of Carnot–Carathéodory, defined as 

where infimum is taken along all horizontal curves  such that , .

Examples

Therefore, the position of the car can be described by a point in a manifold 

One can ask, what is the minimal distance one should drive to get from one position to another? This defines a Carnot–Carathéodory metric on the manifold 

spans the entire algebra. Then choosing any smooth positive quadratic form on  gives a sub-Riemannian metric on the group.

Properties

For every sub-Riemannian manifold, there exists a Hamiltonian, called the sub-Riemannian Hamiltonian, constructed out of the metric for the manifold. Conversely, every such quadratic Hamiltonian induces a sub-Riemannian manifold. The existence of geodesics of the corresponding Hamilton–Jacobi equations for the sub-Riemannian Hamiltonian is given by the Chow–Rashevskii theorem.

See also
Carnot group, a class of Lie groups that form sub-Riemannian manifolds
Distribution

References

Metric geometry
Riemannian geometry
Riemannian manifolds